Russell Howard (born 1980) is a British comedian.

Russell Howard may also refer to:
 Russell D. Howard, American soldier
 Russell J. Howard, Australian scientist
 Russ Howard (born 1956), Canadian curler

See also
 Howard Russell (disambiguation)